Arthur S. Taylor Jr. (April 6, 1929 – February 6, 1995) was an American jazz drummer, who "helped define the sound of modern jazz drumming".

Career
As a teenager, Taylor joined a local Harlem band that featured Sonny Rollins, Jackie McLean and Kenny Drew. After playing in the bands of Howard McGhee (1948), Coleman Hawkins (1950–51), Buddy DeFranco (1952), Bud Powell (1953), George Wallington and Art Farmer (1954), Powell and Wallington again (1954–55), Gigi Gryce and Donald Byrd (1956), he formed his own group, Taylor's Wailers. Between 1957 and 1963, he toured with Donald Byrd, recorded with Miles Davis, Gene Ammons and John Coltrane, and performed with Thelonious Monk; Taylor also was a member of the original Kenny Dorham Quartet of 1957.

In 1963, Taylor moved to Europe, where he lived mainly in France and Belgium for 20 years, playing with local groups and jazz musicians such as Johnny Griffin, John Bodwin, and with travelling American musicians, such as Woody Shaw during the latter's tenure in Paris. Taylor also studied drums in Paris with Kenny Clarke. He returned to the United States to help his mother, who was ill. He continued freelancing after returning to the United States, and in 1991 organized a second band called Taylor's Wailers. He died aged 65 in Beth Israel Hospital, Manhattan, in 1995.

He was the author of Notes and Tones, a 1993 book based on his interviews with other musicians. This was, for many musicians, a ground-breaking work, because it presented the interviewees' perspectives on the wider social, political, and economic forces in which they operated – topics normally not mentioned in mainstream coverage of jazz musicians.

Discography

As leader
 Taylor's Wailers (Prestige, 1957)
 Taylor's Tenors (Prestige, 1959)
 A.T.'s Delight (Blue Note, 1960)
 Mr. A.T. (Enja, 1991)
 Wailin' at the Vanguard (Verve, 1991)

As sideman
With Pepper Adams, et al.
Baritones and French Horns (1957)

With Gene Ammons
The Happy Blues (Prestige, 1956)
Jammin' with Gene (Prestige, 1956)
Funky (Prestige, 1957)
Jammin' in Hi Fi with Gene Ammons (Prestige, 1957)
The Big Sound (Prestige, 1958)
Groove Blues (Prestige, 1958)
Blue Gene (Prestige, 1958)
Boss Tenor (Prestige, 1960)
Velvet Soul (Prestige, 1960 [1964])
Angel Eyes (Prestige, 1960 [1965])
Up Tight! (Prestige, 1961)
Boss Soul! (Prestige, 1961)

With Chris Anderson
My Romance (Vee-Jay, 1960 [1983])

With Dorothy Ashby
In a Minor Groove (New Jazz, 1958)
Hip Harp (Prestige, 1958)

With Benny Bailey
Big Brass (Candid, 1960)

With Kenny Burrell
All Night Long (Prestige, 1956)
All Day Long (Prestige, 1957)
2 Guitars – with Jimmy Raney (Prestige, 1957)
Just Wailin' (New Jazz, 1958) with Herbie Mann, Charlie Rouse and Mal Waldron

With Donald Byrd
2 Trumpets (Prestige, 1956) – with Art Farmer
Jazz Eyes (Regent, 1957) – with John Jenkins
Off to the Races (Blue Note, 1958)
Byrd in Hand (Blue Note, 1959)

With Paul Chambers
Bass on Top (1957)

With Sonny Clark
Sonny's Crib (Blue Note, 1957)

With James Clay
The Sound of the Wide Open Spaces!!!! (Riverside, 1960) – with David "Fathead" Newman

With Jimmy Cleveland
A Map of Jimmy Cleveland (Mercury, 1959)

With Arnett Cobb
Party Time (Prestige, 1959)
More Party Time (Prestige, 1960)
Movin' Right Along (Prestige, 1960)

With John Coltrane
Wheelin' & Dealin'  (1957)
Trane's Blues  (1957)
The Dealers (1957)
Black Pearls (1958)
Lush Life (1958)
The Believer (1958)
Settin' the Pace (1958)
The Last Trane  (1958)
Jazz Way Out (1958)
Traneing In (1958)
Soultrane (1958)
Giant Steps (1959)
Bahia (1964)
Alternate Takes (1975)

With Continuum
Mad About Tadd (1980, Palo Alto Records)

With Eddie "Lockjaw" Davis
Goin' to the Meeting (Prestige, 1962)

With Miles Davis
Miles Ahead (1957)
Collector's Items (Prestige, 1956)

With Walter Davis Jr.
Davis Cup (1959)

With Kenny Dorham
Show Boat (1960)

With Art Farmer
The Art Farmer Septet (Prestige, 1953–54)
When Farmer Met Gryce (Prestige, 1955) – with Gigi Gryce

With Tommy Flanagan
Thelonica (Enja, 1982)

With Red Garland
A Garland of Red (Prestige, 1956)
Red Garland Revisited! (Prestige, 1957 [1969])
The P.C. Blues (Prestige 1956–57 [1970])
Red Garland's Piano (Prestige, 1956–57)
Groovy (Prestige, 1956–57)
All Mornin' Long (Prestige, 1957)
Soul Junction (Prestige, 1957)
John Coltrane with the Red Garland Trio (Prestige, 1958)
Manteca (Prestige, 1958)
Red in Blues-ville(Prestige, 1959)
High Pressure (Prestige, 1957 [1962])
The Red Garland Trio (Moodsville, 1958 [1960])
All Kinds of Weather  (Prestige, 1958)
The Red Garland Trio + Eddie "Lockjaw" Davis (Moodsville, 1959)
Halleloo-Y'-All (Prestige, 1960)

With Matthew Gee
Jazz by Gee (Riverside, 1956)

With Benny Golson
Gettin' with It (New Jazz, 1959)
Free (Argo, 1962)

With Dexter Gordon
One Flight Up (Blue Note, 1964)
The Squirrel (Blue Note, 1967 [1997])
A Day in Copenhagen (MPS, 1969) – with Slide Hampton

With Bennie Green
Hornful of Soul (1960)

With Johnny Griffin
Do Nothing 'til You Hear from Me (Riverside, 1963)

With Tiny Grimes
Tiny in Swingville (Swingville, 1959) – with Jerome Richardson

With Steve Grossman
In New York (Steve Grossman album) (Dreyfus, 1991)

With Gigi Gryce
Jazz Lab (Columbia, 1957) – with Donald Byrd
Gigi Gryce and the Jazz Lab Quintet (Riverside, 1957)
Modern Jazz Perspective (Columbia, 1957) – with Donald Byrd
New Formulas from the Jazz Lab (RCA Victor, 1957) with Donald Byrd
Jazz Lab (Jubilee, 1958) with Donald Byrd
Doin' the Gigi (Uptown, 2011)

With Ernie Henry
Presenting Ernie Henry (Riverside, 1956)

With Elmo Hope and Frank Foster
Hope Meets Foster (Prestige, 1955)

With Milt Jackson
Bags & Flutes (Atlantic, 1957)

With Thad Jones
After Hours (Prestige, 1957)

With Clifford Jordan
Cliff Jordan (Blue Note, 1957)

With Duke Jordan
Flight to Jordan (Blue Note, 1960)

With Ken McIntyre
 Looking Ahead (New Jazz, 1960) with Eric Dolphy

With Jackie McLean
Lights Out! (Prestige, 1956)
4, 5 and 6 (Prestige, 1956)
McLean's Scene (Prestige, 1957)
Alto Madness (Prestige, 1957)
Strange Blues (Prestige, 1957)
A Long Drink of the Blues (Prestige, 1957)
Makin' the Changes (Prestige, 1957 [1959])
Swing, Swang, Swingin' (Blue Note, 1959)
Capuchin Swing (Blue Note, 1960)

With Thelonious Monk
Thelonious Monk and Sonny Rollins (Prestige, 1956)
The Thelonious Monk Orchestra at Town Hall (Riverside, 1956)
5 by Monk by 5 (Riverside, 1959)

With Lee Morgan
Introducing Lee Morgan (1956)
City Lights (Blue Note, 1957)
Candy (Blue Note, 1957)

With Oliver Nelson
Meet Oliver Nelson (New Jazz, 1959)

With Cecil Payne
Patterns of Jazz (Savoy, 1956)

With Bud Powell
The Amazing Bud Powell, Vol. 2 (Blue Note, 1954)
Bud Powell Trio (Roost, 1953)
Bud Powell's Moods (Verve, 1954)
The Lonely One... (Verve, 1955)
Piano Interpretations by Bud Powell (Verve, 1955)
Strictly Powell (RCA, 1956)
Swingin' with Bud (RCA, 1956)
Bud Plays Bird (Blue Note, 1957)
Bud! The Amazing Bud Powell (Vol. 3) (Blue Note, 1957)
The Scene Changes: The Amazing Bud Powell (Vol. 5) (Blue Note, 1958)
Live at Birdland (Queen-disk, recorded 1953)
Three Nights at Birdland (SSJ, 2017; recorded 1953)

With Julian Priester
Spiritsville (Jazzland, 1960)

With Dizzy Reece
Blues in Trinity (1958)

With Charlie Rouse
Takin' Care of Business (Jazzland, 1960)

With Sahib Shihab
Jazz Sahib (Savoy, 1957)

With Horace Silver
Silver's Blue (Columbia, 1956)

With Jimmy Smith
Damn! (Verve, 1995)

With Johnny "Hammond" Smith
Talk That Talk (New Jazz, 1960)
Open House (Riverside, 1963)

With Louis Smith
Here Comes Louis Smith (Blue Note, 1958)

With Sonny Stitt
Stitt Meets Brother Jack (Prestige, 1962) – with Jack McDuff

With Idrees Sulieman, Webster Young, John Coltrane, and Bobby Jaspar
Interplay for 2 Trumpets and 2 Tenors (Prestige, 1957)

With Buddy Tate
Tate-a-Tate (Swingville, 1960) with Clark Terry

With Clark Terry
Top and Bottom Brass (Riverside, 1959)

With Toots Thielmans
Man Bites Harmonica! (Riverside, 1957)

With Stanley Turrentine
ZT's Blues (1961)

With Mal Waldron
Mal-2 (1957)

With Julius Watkins and Charlie Rouse
Les Jazz Modes (Dawn, 1957)

With Randy Weston
African Cookbook (Polydor [France], 1969)
Niles Littlebig (Polydor [France], 1969)

With Lem Winchester
Winchester Special (New Jazz, 1959)
Lem's Beat (New Jazz, 1960)

With Kai Winding & J. J. Johnson
The Great Kai & J. J. (Impulse!, 1960)
With Frank Wright
Uhuru na Umoja (America, 1970)

Bibliography

References

External links

 Art Taylor on Drummerworld.com

1929 births
1995 deaths
Hard bop drummers
Mainstream jazz drummers
Bebop drummers
American jazz drummers
Enja Records artists
Prestige Records artists
Blue Note Records artists
20th-century American drummers
American male drummers
20th-century American male musicians
American male jazz musicians